Blo' Norton is a village and civil parish in the Breckland district of Norfolk, England, on the River Little Ouse, about  west of Diss. The 2001 Census recorded the parish population as 270 people, living in about 100 households.

Early history
Blo' Norton's unusual placename is reputedly derived from ‘Blae’, itself derived from Old English and Old Norse words meaning both ‘cold’ and ‘blue’. The ‘blue’ could refer to the woad plant that grows in wetter areas and is a source of traditional blue dye. ‘Norton’ is a settlement on the north side of the river. The first record of 'Blo' added to the name is in 1291, which in Middle English may have meant 'bleak and cold or exposed' or it may have derived from ‘blae’ meaning blue, perhaps from the growth of the woad plants from which a blue dye can be obtained.

Bill Bryson mentioned the placename in his book Notes From A Small Island. The name was also briefly featured in an episode of the Channel 4 television show So Graham Norton.

There is evidence of people living in the area from Anglo-Saxon times, and perhaps from the Romano-British period. Aerial photographs show outlines of buildings and tracks that may be from the Romano-British period, near to Blo' Norton Hall.

Parish church
The Church of England parish church of St Andrew was built in the 13th century, remodelled in the 14th century and restored in 1879. It is a Grade II* listed building.

The west tower has a ring of six bells. Thomas Osborn, who had bell-foundries at Downham Market in Norfolk and St Neots in Cambridgeshire, cast five of the bells including the tenor in 1794. John Warner & Sons of Cripplegate, London cast the treble bell in 1892.

Blo' Norton Hall

Blo' Norton Hall is a timber-framed, moated Tudor manor house at the end of an avenue of lime trees west of St Andrew's church. It was enlarged in Elizabethan style in 1585. It is a Grade II* listed building.

In the summer of 1906 Virginia Woolf (1882–1941) stayed at Blo' Norton Hall. The visit inspired her short story, "The Journal of Miss Joan Martyn".

Blo' Norton and Thelnetham Fen

South of the village and along the river is the Blo' Norton and Thelnetham Fen Site of Special Scientific Interest, an important calcareous fen wetland site supporting rare plant species including black bog rush Schoenus nigricans and saw sedge Cladium mariscus. The Little Ouse Headwaters Project manages part of this area as well as surrounding wetland areas such as Hinderclay Fen and Suffolk Wildlife Trust also has a reserve on part of the site.

Prince Frederick Duleep Singh

Prince "Freddy" Frederick Duleep Singh (1868–1926) lived at Blo' Norton Hall for the last 20 years of his life and is buried in St Andrew's parish churchyard. For this reason Blo' Norton is part of the Anglo-Sikh Heritage trail.

Frogstock festival
The village used to host the Frogstock festival, which was established in 1995 as a local music festival in answer to the perceived over-commercialisation of festivals such as Glastonbury. Frogstock was last held in 2011.

War Memorial
Blo' Norton's War Memorial is located at the junction between Church Lane and The Street, and the takes the form of a stone cross with an octagonal base. It was unveiled on 7 November 1920 and was funded by donations from local charities and the people of Blo' Norton. It holds the following names for the First World War:
 Second-Lieutenant C. Chad Armstrong-Norris (1899-1917), No. 70 Squadron, Royal Flying Corps
 Ernest Footer

And, the following for the Second World War:
 Corporal William A. Ruddock (d.1944), 7th Battalion, Royal Norfolk Regiment
 Leading-Aircraftman William H. Valentine (1905-1942), No. 2771 (Air Defense) Squadron, RAF Regiment
 Gunner T. Kenneth Cook (d.1943), 179th (Anti-Aircraft) Regiment, Royal Artillery

See also
Little Ouse Headwaters Project
Blo' Norton and Thelnetham Fen

References

Further reading

External links

Civil parishes in Norfolk
Villages in Norfolk
Breckland District